Louis Germain David de Funès de Galarza (31 July 1914 – 27 January 1983) was a French actor and comedian. He is France's favourite actor, according to a series of polls conducted since the late 1960s, having played over 150 roles in film and over 100 on stage. His acting style is remembered for its high-energy performance and his wide range of facial expressions and tics. A considerable part of his best-known acting was directed by Jean Girault.

One of the most famous French actors of all time, Louis de Funès also enjoys widespread international recognition. In addition to his immense fame in the French-speaking world, he is also still a household name in many other parts of the world, including German-speaking countries, the former Soviet Union, former Eastern Bloc, Italy, Spain, Greece, Albania, ex-Yugoslavia, as well as Turkey, Iran, Israel, and Mauritius.

Despite his international fame, Louis de Funès remains almost unknown in the English-speaking world. He was exposed to a wider audience only once in the United States, in 1974, with the release of The Mad Adventures of Rabbi Jacob, which is best remembered for its Rabbi Jacob dance scene and was nominated for a Golden Globe Award. Louis de Funès has two museums dedicated to his life and acting: one in the Château de Clermont, near Nantes, where he resided, as well as another in the town of Saint-Raphaël, Southern France.

Early life
Louis de Funès was born on 31 July 1914 in Courbevoie, Hauts-de-Seine to parents who hailed from Seville, Spain. Since the couple's families opposed their marriage, they eloped to France in 1904. His father, Carlos Luis de Funès de Galarza, a nobleman whose mother descended from the Counts de Galarza (of Basque origin). His father was from Funes.
He had been a lawyer in Spain, but became a diamond cutter upon arriving in France. His mother, Leonor Soto Reguera, was Galician, daughter to Galician lawyer Teolindo Soto Barro, of Portuguese descent.

Known to friends and intimates as "Fufu", de Funès spoke French, Spanish and English. During his youth, he was fond of drawing and playing the piano. He was an alumnus of the lycée Condorcet in Paris. He later dropped out, and his early life was rather inconspicuous; as a youth and young adult, de Funès held menial jobs, from which he was repeatedly fired. He became a bar pianist, working mostly as a jazz pianist in Pigalle, Paris, where he made his customers laugh each time he grimaced. He studied acting for one year at the Simon acting school, where he made some useful contacts, including with Daniel Gélin, among others. In 1936, he married Germaine Louise Elodie Carroyer, with whom he had one child: a son named Daniel; the couple divorced in late 1942. Through the early 1940s, de Funès continued playing the piano in clubs, thinking there was not much call for a short, balding, skinny actor. His wife and Daniel Gélin encouraged him until he managed to overcome his fear of rejection. His wife supported him in the most difficult moments and helped him to manage his career efficiently.

During the occupation of Paris in the Second World War, he continued his piano studies at a music school, where he fell in love with a secretary, Jeanne Barthelémy de Maupassant. She had fallen in love with "the young man who played jazz like God"; they married in 1943 and remained together for forty years until de Funès' death in 1983. They had two sons: Patrick (born on 27 January 1944), who became a doctor, and Olivier (born on 11 August 1949), who became a pilot for Air France Europe and also followed in his father's footsteps by becoming an actor. Olivier de Funès became known for the roles he played in some of his father's films (Les Grandes Vacances, Fantômas se déchaîne, Le Grand Restaurant and Hibernatus being the most famous).

Theatrical career 
De Funès began his show business career in the theatre, where he enjoyed moderate success and also played small roles in films. Even after he attained the status of a movie star, he continued to play theatre roles. His stage career culminated in a magnificent performance in the play Oscar, a role which he would reprise a few years later in the film adaptation.

Film career 

In 1945, thanks to his contact with Daniel Gélin, de Funès made his film debut at the age of 31 with a bit part in Jean Stelli's La Tentation de Barbizon. He appears on screen for less than 40 seconds in the role of the porter of the cabaret Le Paradis, welcoming the character played by Jérôme Chambon in the entrance hall and pointing him to the double doors leading to the main room, saying: "C'est par ici, Monsieur" ("It's this way, Sir"). Chambon declines the invitation, pushing the door himself instead of pulling it open. De Funès then says: "Bien, il a son compte celui-là, aujourd'hui!" ("Well, he had enough, today!").

He went on to perform in 130 film roles over the next 20 years, playing minor roles in over 80 movies before being offered his first leading roles. During this period, de Funès developed a daily routine of professional activities: in the morning, he did dubbing for recognized artists such as Totò, an Italian comic of the time; during the afternoon, he did film work; and in the evening, he performed as a theatre actor.

From 1945 to 1955, he appeared in 50 films, usually as an extra or walk-on. In 1954, he went on to star in such films as Ah! Les belles bacchantes and Le Mouton à cinq pattes. A break came in 1956, when he appeared as the black-market pork butcher Jambier (another small role) in Claude Autant-Lara's well-known World War II comedy, La Traversée de Paris. He achieved stardom in 1963 with Jean Girault's film, Pouic-Pouic. This successful film guaranteed de Funès top billing in all of his subsequent films. At the age of 49, de Funès unexpectedly became a major star of international renown with the success of Le gendarme de Saint-Tropez. After their first successful collaboration, director Jean Girault perceived de Funès as the ideal actor to play the part of the scheming, opportunistic and sycophant gendarme; the first film would led to a series of six.

Another collaboration with director Gérard Oury produced a memorable tandem of de Funès with Bourvil—another great comic actor—in the 1965 film, Le Corniaud. The success of the de Funès-Bourvil partnership was repeated in La Grande Vadrouille, one of the most successful and the largest-grossing film ever made in France, drawing an audience of 17.27 million. It remains his greatest success. Oury envisaged a further reunion of the two comics in his film La Folie des grandeurs, but Bourvil's death in 1970 led to the unlikely pairing of de Funès with Yves Montand in that film.

Eventually, de Funès became France's leading comic actor. Between 1964 and 1979, he topped France's box office of the year's most successful movies seven times. In 1968, all three of his films were in the top ten in France for the year, topped by Le Petit Baigneur.

He co-starred with many of the major French actors of his time, including Jean Marais and Mylène Demongeot in the Fantomas trilogy, and also Jean Gabin, Fernandel, Coluche, Annie Girardot, and Yves Montand. He also worked with Jean Girault in the famous 'Gendarmes' series. In a departure from the Gendarme image, de Funès collaborated with Claude Zidi, who wrote for him a new character full of nuances and frankness in L'aile ou la cuisse (1976), which is arguably the best of his roles. Later, de Funès' considerable musical abilities were showcased in films such as Le Corniaud and Le Grand Restaurant. In 1964, he debuted in the first of the Fantômas series, which launched him into superstardom.

In 1975, Oury turned again to de Funès for a film entitled Le Crocodile, in which he was to play the role of a South American dictator. But in March 1975, de Funès was hospitalized for heart problems and forced to take a break from acting, causing Le Crocodile to be cancelled. After his recovery, he appeared opposite another comic genius, Coluche, in L'Aile ou la cuisse. In 1980, de Funès realised a long-standing dream of making a film version of Molière's play, L'Avare.

De Funès made his final film, Le Gendarme et les gendarmettes, in 1982.

Style 
Unlike the characters he played, de Funès was said to be a very shy person in real life. Capable of an extremely rich and rapidly changing range of facial expressions, de Funès was nicknamed "the man with forty faces per minute." In many of his films, he played the role of a humorously excitable, cranky, middle-aged or mature man with a propensity for hyperactivity, bad faith, and uncontrolled fits of anger. Along with his short height –  – and his facial contortions, this hyperactivity produced a highly comic effect. This was particularly visible when he was paired with Bourvil, who was always given roles of calm, slightly naive, good-humoured men. In de Funès' successful lead role in a cinematic version of Molière's The Miser (L'Avare), these characteristics are greatly muted, percolating just beneath the surface.

Later years and death 
In the later part of his life, de Funès achieved great prosperity and success. He became a knight of France's Légion d'honneur in 1973. He resided in the Château de Clermont, a 17th-century château located in the commune of Le Cellier, 27 kilometers (17 mi) from Nantes in the west of France. The château, overlooking the river Loire, was inherited by his wife, whose aunt had married a descendant of Maupassant. De Funès was an aficionado of roses and planted a rose garden on the château grounds; a variety of rose was named after him: the Louis de Funès rose. A monument honoring him was erected in the château rose garden.

In his later years, de Funès suffered from a heart condition after having two heart attacks caused by the excessive strain of his stage antics. He died of a third heart attack on 27 January 1983, a few months after making his final film. He was laid to rest in the Cimetière du Cellier, the cemetery situated on the Château de Clermont grounds.

Legacy 
De Funès was portrayed on a postage stamp issued on 3 October 1998 by the French postal service. He was also portrayed in French comics, including as a gambler in Lucky Luke ("The One-Armed Bandit") and as a film studio worker in Clifton ("Dernière Séance"). In 2013, a museum dedicated to De Funès was created in the Château de Clermont where he had resided. In 2019, another De Funès museum opened in Saint-Raphaël, Var.

Filmography

See also
Rabbi Jacob dance

References

External links
 
 Louis de Funès – Films de France
 DeFunes.nl – Dutch website about Louis de Funès
 Louisdefunes.ru – Louis de Funès in Russia

1914 births
1983 deaths
20th-century French male actors
20th-century French comedians
Chevaliers of the Légion d'honneur
French monarchists
French comedians
French male film actors
French male stage actors
French male television actors
French people of Galician descent
French people of Spanish descent
French people of Portuguese descent
Interlingue
Lycée Condorcet alumni
People from Courbevoie
César Honorary Award recipients